Crosby Municipal Airport  is a public airport located one mile (1.6 km) north of the central business district of Crosby, in Divide County, North Dakota, United States. It is owned by the Crosby Airport Authority.

Facilities and aircraft

For the 12-month period ending July 31, 2007, the airport had 2,440 aircraft operations: 90% general aviation, 8% air taxi, and 2% military.

Notes

External links

Airports in North Dakota
Buildings and structures in Divide County, North Dakota
Transportation in Divide County, North Dakota